R. nana may refer to:
 Rivetina nana, a praying mantis species
 Ravenea nana, a flowering plant species found only in Madagascar

See also
 Nana (disambiguation)